Moradabad-e Chahgavari (also Romanized as Morādābād-e Chahgavārī; also known as Morādābād and Morādābād-e Chegūrī) is a village in Gonbaki Rural District, Gonbaki District, Rigan County, Kerman Province, Iran. At the 2006 census, its population was 506, in 94 families.

References 

Populated places in Rigan County